Byron Zózimo Tenorio Quintero (born 14 June 1966) is an Ecuadorian retired football defender.

International career
Tenorio was a member of the Ecuador national football team for nine years, and obtained a total number of 53 caps during his career, scoring three goals. He made his debut on 7 June 1988 and played his last international match for Ecuador on 12 January 1997. He competed in three Copa Américas: 1989, 1991 and 1993.

Retirement
Tenorio is currently a referee in the Ecuadorian Indoor Soccer Leagues in New York.

References

External links

 
 

1966 births
Living people
Sportspeople from Esmeraldas, Ecuador
Association football defenders
Ecuadorian footballers
Ecuador international footballers
1989 Copa América players
1991 Copa América players
1993 Copa América players
C.D. El Nacional footballers
Barcelona S.C. footballers
C.S. Emelec footballers
L.D.U. Quito footballers
Unión Española footballers
S.D. Quito footballers
L.D.U. Portoviejo footballers
Ecuadorian Serie A players
Ecuadorian Serie B players
Chilean Primera División players
Ecuadorian expatriate sportspeople in Chile
Ecuadorian expatriate footballers
Expatriate footballers in Chile